Tord is a given name, derived from the elements 'thor' meaning thunder, thunder god; and '' meaning peace, beautiful, fair. The name developed as a short form of Thorfrid (Old Norse).

Notable people with the name include:

Tord Andersson (born 1942), Swedish diver
Tord Bernheim (1914–1992), Swedish film actor
Tord Bonde (c. 1350s–1417), medieval Swedish magnate
Tord Boontje (born 1968), Dutch industrial product designer
Tord Filipsson (born 1950), Swedish former cyclist
Tord Ganelius (1925–2016), Swedish mathematician
Tord Asle Gjerdalen (born 1983), Norwegian cross-country skier
Tord Godal (1909–2002), Norwegian theologian and bishop
Tord Grip (born 1938), Swedish football coach and manager
Tord Gustavsen (born 1970), Norwegian jazz pianist and composer
Tord Hagen (1914–2008), Swedish diplomat and ambassador
Tord Hall (1910–1987), Swedish mathematician
Tord Henriksson (born 1965), Swedish triple jumper
Tord Holmgren (born 1957), Swedish footballer
Tord Johansson (1955–2015), Swedish businessman
Tord Larsson (born 1989), Norwegian comic artist, known for his work on the British web series Eddsworld (as well being the real life counterpart of the character with the same name)
Tord Lien (born 1975), Norwegian politician
Tord Linnerud (born 1974), Norwegian rallycross driver
Tord Lundström (born 1945), Swedish professional ice hockey player
Tord Magnuson (born 1941), Swedish business executive
Tord Øverland Knudsen (born 1982), Norwegian musician
Tord Palander (1902–1972), Swedish economist
Tord Sahlén (born 1937), Swedish sprint canoer
Tord Stål (1906–1972), Swedish film actor
Tord Wiksten (born 1971), Swedish biathlete